Lynchburg is an unincorporated area and census-designated place (CDP) in DeSoto County, Mississippi, United States. The population was 2,437 at the 2010 census.

Geography
Lynchburg is located in northwestern DeSoto County at  (34.965750, -90.102908). It is bordered to the east by the city of Horn Lake.

Demographics

As of the census of 2000, there were 2,959 people, 1,037 households, and 850 families residing in the CDP. The racial makeup of the CDP was 93.17% White, 1.99% African American, 0.34% Native American, 1.05% Asian, 0.10% Pacific Islander, 2.91% from other races, and 0.44% from two or more races. Hispanic or Latino of any race were 4.12% of the population.

There were 1,037 households, out of which 41.0% had children under the age of 18 living with them, 67.4% were married couples living together, 9.4% had a female householder with no husband present, and 18.0% were non-families. 13.5% of all households were made up of individuals, and 3.4% had someone living alone who was 65 years of age or older. The average household size was 2.85 and the average family size was 3.11.

In the CDP, the population was spread out, with 28.1% under the age of 18, 8.1% from 18 to 24, 34.9% from 25 to 44, 22.1% from 45 to 64, and 6.8% who were 65 years of age or older. The median age was 33 years. For every 100 females, there were 101.8 males. For every 100 females age 18 and over, there were 99.7 males.

The median income for a household in the CDP was $54,714, and the median income for a family was $61,495. Males had a median income of $41,586 versus $25,332 for females. The per capita income for the CDP was $20,455. About 5.9% of families and 9.0% of the population were below the poverty line, including 10.1% of those under age 18 and 8.9% of those age 65 or over.

Education
Lynchburg is served by the DeSoto County School District.

References

Census-designated places in DeSoto County, Mississippi
Census-designated places in Mississippi
Memphis metropolitan area